is a railway station in the town of Izumozaki, Santō District, Niigata Prefecture, Japan, operated by East Japan Railway Company (JR East).

Lines
Izumozaki Station is served by the Echigo Line and is 24.8 kilometers from the terminus of the line at Kashiwazaki Station.

Station layout
The station consists of two opposed ground-level side platforms serving two tracks, connected by a footbridge.

The station has a Midori no Madoguchi staffed ticket office. Suica farecard cannot be used at this station.

Platforms

History
Izumozaki Station was opened on 28 December 1912. A new station building was completed in 1981. The cargo handling center was closed in 1987. With the privatization of Japanese National Railways (JNR) on 1 April 1987, the station came under the control of JR East.

Passenger statistics
In fiscal 2017, the station was used by an average of 179 passengers daily (boarding passengers only).

Surrounding area
 
 
Izumozaki town hall
Izunozaki Post Office

See also
 List of railway stations in Japan

References

External links
 JR East station information 

Railway stations in Japan opened in 1912
Railway stations in Niigata Prefecture
Echigo Line
Stations of East Japan Railway Company
Izumozaki, Niigata